Wladyslaw Kazimierz Lemiszko (19 June 1911 – 17 April 1988) was a former Polish international Ice Hockey player, Olympian, and later football manager.

Ice Hockey

Club
Growing up Lemiszko was a talented athlete excelling in; ice hockey, athletics, tennis, swimming, and skiing. It was ice hockey in which Lemiszko decided to play professionally, starting with Czarni Lwów. He was with Czarni for 10 years, finishing runners-up in the league in 1934, winning the league in 1935. He played for Pogon Lwów from 1936–39, before the outbreak of World War II halted the Polish league. During the war he played for Dynamo Kiev & Lviv, before playing professionally in Poland again for one final season in 1946 with Cracovia.

International
Lemiszko played 15 times for Poland and was involved with the Polish Winter Olympic team for 1936 being hosted in the German town of Garmisch-Partenkirchen. In the Olympics Poland were knocked out in the group stages finishing 3rd in their group.

Football

Lemiszko managed several football teams starting with Okocimski KS Brzesko, before managing; Pogoń Prudnik in 1948, Grybovia Grybów, Metal Tarnów, Ogniwo Rzeszów, Pafawag Wrocław, JKS 1909 Jarosław, Lechia Gdańsk in 1964, Stal Mielec, Stal Sanok, Olimpia Poznań, Karpaty Krosno, GKS Błękitni Tarnów, Stal Kraśnik, and finally Unia Racibórz.

Honours

Ice Hockey
Czarni Lwów
Ekstraklasa
Winners: 1935
Runners-up: 1934

Cracovia
Ekstraklasa
Winners: 1946

References

1911 births
1988 deaths
Ice hockey players at the 1936 Winter Olympics
Olympic ice hockey players of Poland
Polish expatriate sportspeople in the Soviet Union
Polish football managers
Lechia Gdańsk managers
Karpaty Krosno managers
Sportspeople from Lviv
People from the Kingdom of Galicia and Lodomeria
Polish Austro-Hungarians